Belmont is an unincorporated community in Washington Township, Brown County, in the U.S. state of Indiana.

History

A post office was established at Belmont in 1884, and remained in operation until it was discontinued in 1916.

They named their summer retreat the House of the Singing Winds; it became their year-round residence in 1912. In July 1945 Selma donated the entire property and more than 300 of her husband's paintings to the Indiana Department of Conservation (the present-day Indiana Department of Natural Resources) to preserve it as the T. C. Steele State Historic Site. It was listed on the National Register of Historic Places in 1973. The T. C. Steele Memorial Cemetery, which is also in the state historic site near Belmont, includes the graves of T. C. and Selma Steele.

Geography
The hamlet is located on State Road 46, halfway between Nashville and Bloomington in west-central Brown County.

References

External links

Unincorporated communities in Brown County, Indiana
Unincorporated communities in Indiana
1884 establishments in Indiana
Populated places established in 1884